Ramsline Halt is a disused single-platform railway station in the Pear Tree area of Derby, England. It was opened by British Rail in 1990 to serve football specials bringing away supporters to the Baseball Ground, then the home stadium of Derby County F.C.   The station cost £320,000 to build, partly funded by the Football Trust, but only four trains ever stopped there. In 1997 Derby County moved to the new Pride Park Stadium and Ramsline Halt closed. In spite of this, it remains in reasonable condition.  There is no current access to it, but it can be seen from Osmaston Road. The station name board is now at the National Football Museum.

The purpose of the station was to prevent crowd trouble and aid policing by keeping visiting supporters away from the main Derby station, the city centre and residential areas.

References

Derby County F.C.
Disused railway stations in Derby
Railway stations in Great Britain opened in 1990
Railway stations in Great Britain closed in 1997
Railway stations opened by British Rail